Brigadier Dollard Ménard  (7 March 1913 – 14 January 1997) was a senior officer in the Canadian Army. As a lieutenant colonel, he was wounded five times during the Dieppe Raid in 1942 while leading Les Fusiliers Mont-Royal. His story inspired a famous Canadian World War II poster Ce qu’il faut pour vaincre (What it takes to win). He was later made a Companion of the Distinguished Service Order. Since all of the other commanding officers were either killed or captured, he was the only commanding officer who had landed at Dieppe to return to Britain after the raid.

Military career
Upon graduation from the Royal Military College of Canada, student # 2290 in 1932, he received his lieutenant's commission in 1936 in the Royal 22e Régiment ("the Van Doos"). He served in India in the infantry, the cavalry and the tanks from 1938 to 1940 and took part in the Waziristan campaign. In March 1940, he was promoted to captain and joined the staff of the Inspector General for the East of Canada. 
He was commanding officer of the East Sector of Quebec, which included amongst others Camp Valcartier from 1958 to 1962. He insisted that all units under his command with a francophone majority use French for drill and parade orders.

He was posted to Army Headquarters, Ottawa, in 1962, to work with Major-General Arthur Wrinch, who was Major-General Survival. He remained at Army Headquarters until he retired in 1965.

Later life
In 1994, he was made a Grand Officer of the National Order of Quebec. His citation for the Order of the Army reads:

Aged 83, Ménard died on 14 January 1997.

Medals for sale
In 2005, a member of his family put his medals up for auction. This raised considerable media attention due to the risk of the medals being purchased by non-Canadians. Quebec philanthropist Ivonis Mazzarolo paid $40,000 to keep the medals in Canada. http://northernblue.ca/mblog/index.php?url=http://northernblue.ca/mblog/archives/19-General-Dollard-Menards-Medals-Go-to-Les-Fusiliers-Mont-Royal.html&serendipity%5Bcview%5D=linear

References

Books
4237 Dr. Adrian Preston & Peter Dennis (Edited) "Swords and Covenants" Rowman And Littlefield, London. Croom Helm. 1976.
H16511 Dr. Richard Arthur Preston "To Serve Canada: A History of the Royal Military College of Canada" 1997 Toronto, University of Toronto Press, 1969.
H16511 Dr. Richard Arthur Preston "Canada's RMC – A History of Royal Military College" Second Edition 1982
H16511 Dr. Richard Preston "R.M.C. and Kingston: The effect of imperial and military influences on a Canadian community" 1968 Kingston, Ontario.
H1877 R. Guy C. Smith (editor) "As You Were! Ex-Cadets Remember". In 2 Volumes. Volume I: 1876–1918. Volume II: 1919–1984. RMC. Kingston, Ontario. The R.M.C. Club of Canada. 1984
Le Général Dollard Ménard, De Dieppe au Référendum, By Pierre Vennat, Éditions Art Global, 340 pages. 2004

External links
 
 Dollard Ménard E-Veritas

1913 births
1997 deaths
Canadian generals
Grand Officers of the National Order of Quebec
Canadian Companions of the Distinguished Service Order
Royal Military College of Canada alumni
Université Laval alumni
Canadian Army personnel of World War II
Royal 22nd Regiment officers
Les Fusiliers Mont-Royal officers